Tancred (113820 February 1194) was King of Sicily from 1189 to 1194. He was born in Lecce an illegitimate son of Roger III, Duke of Apulia (the eldest son of King Roger II) by his mistress Emma, a daughter of Achard II, Count of Lecce. He inherited the title "Count of Lecce" from his grandfather and is consequently often referred to as Tancred of Lecce.  Due to his short stature and unhandsome visage, he was mocked by his critics as "The Monkey King".

Early career 
After the death of Duke Roger, to prevent any future trouble, King Roger II kept Tancred and his younger brother William in close custody in Palermo.

On 9 March 1161, Tancred joined his uncle Simon, Prince of Taranto, in invading the palace, detained the king and queen, William I and Margaret, and their two sons, and incited a massacre of Muslims. Originally, the older of these two sons, Roger IV, Duke of Apulia, was destined to be crowned in place of William, but soon the populace supported the accession of Simon himself. Before Simon could put himself forward as a candidate, however, the rebellion had broken down and the people were restless. The insurrectionists were forced to free the king and retreat to their castles. Pardon was given them on condition of exile and many, including Tancred, took the offer. Tancred was exiled to Constantinople and returned to Sicily in 1166 upon the accession of the new king, his cousin William II.

In 1174 Tancred led a large fleet to Egypt on behalf of William II. The Sicilians landed near Alexandria but when they realised that their expected allies would not be coming (due to King Amalric I of Jerusalem's death) and with Saladin's army approaching they returned to their ships and sailed home.

As William II was heirless, Tancred had a chance to claim the throne; to prevent this, in October 1184 William released his aunt Constance from monastery, approved her marriage and designated her as his heir.

In June 1185, Tancred led a huge Sicilian fleet of 300 ships under the command of Richard, Count of Acerra his brother-in-law to Durazzo to attack the core of the Byzantine Empire. In August, surrounded by navy and army, Thessaloniki was occupied and looted. The Sicilian army was then heavily damaged by the army of the Byzantine emperor Isaac II and was annihilated on the way back to the Balkans, while the fleet of Tancred returned to Sicily unharmed.

In June 1186, Tancred and Margaritus of Brindisi led the Norman fleet to Cyprus (the governor of Cyprus, Isaac Comnenus, had rebelled against Byzantine), captured 70 warships of Isaac II easily, expelled the Byzantine generals who came there, causing the greatest naval loss of Byzantine empire; later Margaritus was appointed as Counts of Zakynthos, Cephalonia, and Ithaki.

Tancred was the governor of Lecce: he built the Church of St. Nicholas in Catado in Lecce (1180); he built the complex of St. Maria church near Squinzano and the important works in the Otranto Cathedral.

Kingship

Accession 
Despite having sworn fealty to Constance, as soon as William II died, in 1189, Tancred rebelled and seized control of the island. He was crowned early in 1190. His coup was backed by the vice chancellor Matthew d'Ajello and the official class, while the rival claims of Constance and her husband, Henry VI, King of the Romans, were supported by most of the nobles. Roger, Count of Andria, also a candidate for Sicilian throne, was among the supporters of Constance and Henry. Matthew d'Ajello managed to defame Roger, and in the same year Richard, Count of Acerra brother-in-law of Tancred tricked Roger into captivity and execution. Matthew also persuaded Pope Clement III to support Tancred, and Tancred appointed Matthew as chancellor.

Treaty with Richard 
Tancred was a good soldier, though his tiny stature earned him the nickname "Tancredulus" from the poet chronicler Peter of Eboli. Despite a measure of popular support, his rule faced daunting challenges right from the start.

In 1190, King Richard I of England arrived in Sicily at the head of a large crusading army on its way to the Holy Land. Richard immediately demanded the release of his sister, William II's wife Joan, imprisoned by Tancred in 1189, along with every penny of her dowry and dower (in response of her vocal support of Germans). He also insisted that Tancred fulfil the financial commitments made by William II to the crusade. When Tancred balked at these demands, Richard seized a monastery and the castle of La Bagnara.

Richard was joined in Sicily by the French crusading army, led by King Philip II. The presence of two foreign armies soon caused unrest among the locals. In October the people of Messina revolted, demanding that the foreigners leave the island. Richard responded by attacking Messina, which he captured on 4 October 1190. After the city had been looted and burned, Richard established his base there and decided to stay the winter.

Richard remained at Messina until March 1191, when Tancred finally agreed to a treaty. According to the treaty's main terms:
Joan was to be released, receiving her dower along with the dowry.
Richard and Philip recognised Tancred as King of Sicily and vowed to keep the peace among all three of their kingdoms.
Richard officially proclaimed his nephew Arthur of Brittany as his heir presumptive, and Tancred promised to marry one of his daughters to Arthur when he came of age (Arthur was four years old at the time).

After signing the treaty Richard and Philip finally left Sicily for the Holy Land. It is rumoured that before he left, Richard gave Tancred a sword he claimed was Excalibur in order to secure their friendship.

Contention with Constance 
Having at last rid himself of the crusaders, Tancred next confronted the threat from the north. In April 1191 in Rome, Henry and Constance were crowned emperor and empress of the Holy Roman Empire by Pope Celestine III, and now the pair turned south to claim the Kingdom of Sicily. Constance accompanied her husband at the head of a substantial imperial army that descended into the Regno. The northern towns of the kingdom opened their gates to Henry, including the earliest Norman strongholds Capua and Aversa.  Salerno, once Roger II's mainland capital, sent word ahead that Henry was welcome and invited Constance to stay in her father's old palace to escape the summer heat. Naples offered the first resistance of the whole campaign, withstanding a siege with the help of Margaritus of Brindisi's fleet, until much of the imperial army had succumbed to malaria and disease. Eventually the imperial army was forced to withdraw from the kingdom altogether. Constance remained in Salerno with a small garrison, as a sign that Henry would soon return.

Once Henry had withdrawn with the bulk of the imperial army, the towns that had supposedly fallen to the empire immediately declared their allegiance to Tancred, for the most part now fearing his retribution. The populace of Salerno saw an opportunity to win some favour with Tancred and delivered Constance to him in Messina, an important prize given that Henry had every intention of returning. Tancred angrily blamed Constance for German invasion, but Constance, in her attire as empress, replied that she was taking back her dominion grabbed by Tancred. Despite this Tancred always treated his aunt, now detained, honourably with courtesy, which his wife Queen Sibylla strongly opposed, believing this would implicitly acknowledge the claim of the latter. Constance was sent to Palermo supervised by Sibylla, eating with her and sleeping in her bedroom. Sybilla suggested that Constance be put to death after sensing that the citizens of Palermo seemed to sympathize with her or view her as the legal heiress of Sicily, but Tancred did not agree, worrying that this would harm his popularity; instead, he suggested Sybilla to consult with Matthew d'Ajello, and after receiving a letter written by Matthew d'Ajello in presence of Sybilla, he had Constance locked in Castel dell'Ovo in Naples to be better-guarded. With the empress in his hand Tancred initially wanted to force Henry into a cease-fire and would not permit her to be ransomed unless Henry recognized him. In 1192 he created Margaritus Count of Malta, perhaps for his unexpected success in capturing the empress. However, Tancred was willing to give up his negotiation advantage, that is, his aunt, in exchange for Pope Celestine III legitimizing him as King of Sicily. In turn, the Pope was hoping that by securing Constance's safe passage back to Rome, Henry would be better disposed towards the papacy, and he was still hoping to keep the empire and the kingdom from uniting. Under the Pope's threat of excommunication, Tancred was forced to do so and gave Constance gifts. However, imperial soldiers were able to intervene at the borders of the Papal States before Constance made it to Rome; and they returned her safely across the Alps in summer 1192. So both Tancred and Pope effectively gained nothing from the captivity of the Empress.

Henry had left garrisons along the frontiers of the Regno. Tancred now sought to win over the towns by extensive grants of privileges. At Gravina (June 1192) he reinforced his papal support by surrendering the royal legateship over Sicily. In 1192 and 1193 he personally led successful campaigns against the Apulian barons. But his death at Palermo (20 February 1194) two months after that of his young son and co-king, Roger III, opened the way for Hohenstaufen rule in Sicily.

His widow, Sibylla of Acerra, established a regency for their son, William III, but Henry returned to Italy later that year, with his army financed by the lucrative ransom of Richard I. Naples surrendered in May, almost without a blow, and the rest of the Regno followed. Sybilla and the loyal Margaritus prepared to defend Palermo, but the citizens admitted the Emperor on 20 November 1194. Tancred's family fell into Henry's hands, and William III, rumoured castrated and blinded, seemed to have died in Germany in 1198. Henry also had the body of Tancred pulled out of his grave.

Family 
Tancred's children with Sibylla were: 
Roger III, duke of Apulia and king of Sicily
William III, duke of Apulia and king of Sicily
Elvira, countess of Lecce after the death of her brother; married firstly Walter III of Brienne, secondly Giacomo Sanseverino, Count of Tricario, and thirdly Tigrini Guidi, Count of Modigliano (or Count Palatine in Tuscany?)
Constance, married Pietro Ziani, later Doge of Venice
Medania
Valdrada, married Giacomo Tello, later Doge of Venice

Notes

References
 John Julius Norwich, The Kingdom in the Sun, reprinted as part of his The Normans in Sicily, 

Tancred of Sicily
Tancred of Sicily
12th-century Kings of Sicily
Counts of Lecce
Italo-Normans
Sicilian people of Norman descent
Christians of the Third Crusade
Hauteville family
Year of birth unknown
Counts of Malta